St Nicholas Hospital may refer to:

 Hospital of St Nicholas, Nantwich, medieval hospice in Cheshire, England
 St Nicholas Hospital, Newcastle upon Tyne, modern psychiatric hospital in England
 St Nicholas Hospital, St Andrews, medieval leper hospital in Scotland
 St Nicholas Hospital, Lagos, in Nigeria